Montgomery Township is one of the fifteen townships of Marion County, Ohio, United States.  The 2010 census found 2,330 people in the township; 747 lived in the village of LaRue and 515 lived in the village of New Bloomington.

Geography
Located in the western part of the county, it borders the following townships:
Grand Township - north
Salt Rock Township - northeast corner
Big Island Township - east
Bowling Green Township - south
Dudley Township, Hardin County - west
Goshen Township, Hardin County - northwest corner

Two villages are located in Montgomery Township: LaRue in the southwest, and New Bloomington in the southeast.

Name and history
Statewide, other Montgomery Townships are located in Ashland and Wood counties.

Government
The township is governed by a three-member board of trustees, who are elected in November of odd-numbered years to a four-year term beginning on the following January 1. Two are elected in the year after the presidential election and one is elected in the year before it. There is also an elected township fiscal officer, who serves a four-year term beginning on April 1 of the year after the election, which is held in November of the year before the presidential election. Vacancies in the fiscal officership or on the board of trustees are filled by the remaining trustees.

References

External links
County website

Townships in Marion County, Ohio
Townships in Ohio